Eclectic Materia Medica is a materia medica written by the eclectic medicine doctor Harvey Wickes Felter (co-author with John Uri Lloyd of King's American Dispensatory). This was the last, articulate, but in the end, futile attempt to stem the tide of Standard Practice Medicine, the antithesis of the model of the rural primary care "vitalist" physician that was the basis for Eclectic medicine.   The herbal portions of the Materia Medica can be found at the websites below, but the book also contained alkaloids, salts, chemicals, injected compounds and other products well-outside of the herbal realm.

References

External links
Felter's Eclectic Materia Medica html version @ Henriette Kress's Herbal website.
The Eclectic Materia Medica, Pharmacology and Therapeutics  by Harvey Wickes Felter, M.D. (1922) Bookmarked Acrobat (.pdf) files only from Michael Moore's website.

1898 non-fiction books
1922 non-fiction books
Health and wellness books
Eclectic medicine